Weebo or Weebo Station is a pastoral lease that has operated as both a sheep and cattle station located about  south of Leinster and about  north west of Leonora in the Goldfields region of Western Australia. The name comes from an Aboriginal word wipu meaning "tail".

The station has a large homestead and two cottages, each with three bedrooms. Stock are watered at 63 water points around the property.

The traditional owners of the area are the Kuwarra people, who have inhabited the area for thousands of years.

The property was initially established by Pierce and Gilmore, who acquired the  lease prior to 1901. They stocked the property with 1,000 sheep, 250 cattle and 50 horses. The property adjoined Ducie Downs at this time. Gilmore sold the  property in 1926 to W. H. Nicholls. Sir Walter James then acquired the property in 1927.

A new shearing shed was constructed in 1928 by James and his partner, Thurbyshire, with 5,199 sheep being shorn producing 116 bales of wool.

In 1960 the property was stocked with 9,504 sheep, which were shorn to produce 270 bales of wool.

In 2009 the lease was owned by Nickel West, a subsidiary of BHP, and was managed by Simon Kopke. Prior to 2008 Weebo was running 8,000 sheep but was completely destocked that year after experiencing problems with wild dogs. Kopke introduced a herd of 200 goats onto the property for the domestic meat market into one  paddock. The goats were being protected by an electrified fence and four Maremma dogs.

The property was sold by BHP Nickel West in December 2015 and purchased by B & SL Prosser. Since purchase the station has been converted from grazing sheep and goats to cattle.

See also
List of ranches and stations

References

Sources

 https://www.realestate.com.au/sold/property-livestock-wa-leinster-7767985

Pastoral leases in Western Australia
Goldfields-Esperance
Stations (Australian agriculture)